The  (Yearbook for Intermediate Sexual Types) was an annual publication of the Scientific-Humanitarian Committee (WhK), an early LGBT rights organization founded by German sexologist Magnus Hirschfeld in 1897. The periodical featured articles on scientific, literary, and political topics related to sexual and gender minorities (sexual intermediaries). It was published regularly from 1899 to 1923 (sometimes quarterly) and more sporadically until 1933.

Notable contributors 

 Psychiatry and sexology: Iwan Bloch, Alfred Fuchs, Richard von Krafft-Ebing, Albert Moll
 History und philology: Hans Licht (pseudonym of Paul Brandt), Numa Praetorius (pseudonym of Eugen Wilhelm), Lucien von Römer
 Art and literature: Elisabeth Dauthendey, Kurt Hiller, Elisar von Kupffer
 Theoretics of third gender: Hans Blüher, Benedict Friedlaender
 Feminism, lesbian rights: Arduin (pseudonym of Karl Friedrich Jordan), Anna Rüling (pseudonym of Theodora Sprüngli)

References

LGBT-related journals
Annual journals
German-language journals
Publications established in 1897
Publications disestablished in 1933
1897 establishments in Germany
1933 disestablishments in Germany
LGBT literature in Germany
First homosexual movement
1890s in LGBT history